Pawle may refer to:

James and Janet Pawle, characters in Village of the Damned, a 1960 British science fiction film
John Pawle (1915–2010), English sportsman, stockbroker, and painter
Lennox Pawle (1872–1936), English stage and film actor

See also
Mawle